The , or  , refers to the  in general use until orthographic reforms after World War II; the current orthography was adopted by Cabinet order in 1946. By that point the historical orthography was no longer in accord with Japanese pronunciation. It differs from modern usage (Gendai kana-zukai) in the number of characters and the way those characters are used. There was considerable opposition to the official adoption of the current orthography, on the grounds that the historical orthography conveys meanings better, and some writers continued to use it for many years after.

The historical orthography is found in almost all Japanese dictionaries, such as Kōjien. In the current edition of the Kōjien, if the historical orthography is different from the modern spelling, the old spelling is printed in tiny katakana between the modern kana and kanji transcriptions of the word. Ellipses are used to save space when the historical and modern spellings are identical. Older editions of the Kōjien gave priority to the historical orthography.

The historical orthography should not be confused with hentaigana, alternate kana that were declared obsolete with the orthographic reforms of 1900.

General differences

In historical kana usage:
 Two kana are used that are obsolete today:  wi and  we. These are today read as i and e. Words that formerly contained those characters are now written using  i and  e respectively.
 Outside of its use as a particle, the  wo kana is used to represent the o sound in some, but not all, words.
 Yōon sounds, such as  shō or  kyō, are not written with a small kana ; depending on the word, they are written with either two or three full-sized kana. If written with two kana and the last one is  ya,  yu, or  yo, then it represents a short syllable of one mora, such as  kyo. If written with two or three kana and the last one is  u or  fu, then it represents a long syllable of two moras. The first kana is not always the same as one used in the modern spelling, as in  kyō "today", written  kefu. If written with three kana, the middle one will always be  ya,  yu, or  yo, and the last kana will always be  u or  fu, as in  chō, the counter for tools, guns, etc., written  chiyau.
 The series of kana ha hi fu he ho are used to represent, in some words, the sounds wa, i, u, e, o, respectively.
 Precedence is given to grammar over pronunciation. For example, the verb warau (to laugh), is written  warafu, and in accordance with Japanese grammar rules, waraō, the volitional form of warau, is written  warahau.
 The kana  du and  di, which are mostly only used in rendaku in modern kana usage, are more common. Modern kana usage replaces them with the identically-pronounced  zu and  ji in most cases. For example, ajisai (hydrangea) is written  adisawi.

Most of the historical kana usage has been found to accurately represent certain aspects of the way words sounded during the Heian period. As the spoken language has continued to develop, some orthography looks odd to the modern eye. As these peculiarities follow fairly regular patterns, they are not difficult to learn. However, some of the historical kana usages are etymologically mistakes. For example, 
 aruiwa (or) might be found written incorrectly as:  *aruhiwa or  *aruwiwa
 mochiwiru (use) might be found written incorrectly as:  *mochihiru
 tsukue (desk, table) might be found written incorrectly as:  *tsukuwe

Those familiar with Japanese writing may notice that most of the differences apply to words which are usually written in Kanji anyway, and so would require no changes to switch from one Kana system to another (unless furigana are employed).  In particular, yōon sounds occur almost exclusively in the Chinese-derived readings that are usually only seen in Kanji compounds (although not entirely;  kyō "today," written  kefu in the old system, is a native Japanese word), and therefore do not look any different (without furigana).  The relative lack of difference in appearance in practice between the two systems was a major reason the spelling reform succeeded, and also why the three grammatical particles o, e, wa continue to be written as  wo,  he, and  ha instead of  o,  e, and  wa;  many felt that changing these exceedingly common spellings would unnecessarily confuse readers.  It is also for this reason that many character dictionaries continue to include the historical spellings, since they are relevant there.

Some forms of unusual kana usage are not, in fact, historical kana usage. For example, writing  dojō (loach, a sardine-like fish) in the form  dozeu is not historical kana usage (which was  dodiyau), but a kind of slang writing originating in the Edo period.

Examples
Here are some representative examples showing the historical and modern spellings and the kanji representation.

The table at the bottom gives a more complete list of the changes in spelling patterns.

Current usage 
Historical kana usage can be used to look up words in larger dictionaries and dictionaries specializing in old vocabulary, which are in print in Japan. Because of the great discrepancy between the pronunciation and spelling and the widespread adoption of modern kana usage, historical kana usage is almost never seen, except in a few special cases. Also, some long-standing company names retain yōon in full-sized kana, like  (Canon) or stamp manufacturer  (Shachihata).

In addition, alternate kana letterforms, known as hentaigana , have nearly disappeared. A few uses remain, such as kisoba, often written using obsolete kana on the signs of soba shops.

The use of  wo,  he, and  ha instead of  o,  e, and  wa for the grammatical particles o, e, wa is a remnant of historical kana usage.

Table of differences 

The following tables summarize every possible historical spelling for the syllables which were spelled differently under the historical system.  When more than one historical spelling is given for a particular modern spelling, the various historical spellings were etymologically (and at one point phonetically) distinct and occurred in different words (i.e., are not merely different ways to spell the same word).  The tables are sorted using the gojūon ordering system.

Note that the dakuten (voicing mark) was frequently omitted as well, as in the station sign at right.

Table references

Notes

The spellings in the first table only apply to word-medial kana: word-initial occurrences of わ, い, う, え,and お were never written as は, ひ, ふ, へ, or ほ, respectively.
In modern Japanese orthography, ぢ (di) is only used in compound words where rendaku causes ち (chi) to become voiced.  This is retained in order to avoid confusion (the usage of づ (du) in modern orthography is the same).  The spelling rules that use ぢ in a modern spelling are referring to these cases only; they therefore will never apply to individual words.  In historical kana, however, ぢ (and づ) were sometimes used where じ (or ず) are used in modern kana.  This original represented a different phoneme (and still does in some dialects), but no longer does in Standard Japanese.  The historical-kana-only spellings using ぢ are listed under modern spellings starting with じ.
The different spellings for the sokuon depend on what mora (if any) was elided into the following consonant to form the geminate consonant.  For example, 学期 (gakki "semester") is spelled がくき (gakuki) in historical kana because the on'yomi of 学 used in this compound is がく (gaku).  Geminate consonants in native Japanese words were formed either by the elision of a long vowel, as in 真赤な (makka-na "bright red"; once まあかな, maaka-na), or by some random process, as in 屹度 (kitto "surely"; once きと, kito); such words are written with the full-size つ (tu) in historical kana.  In general, a Japanese on'yomi can end in either a vowel, ち, つ, き, or く, (ち and つ corresponding to Middle Chinese final -t, and き and く corresponding to Middle Chinese final -k), so these are the only four kana which can replace the sokuon in historical kana.  Historically, on'yomi could also end with pu (for the Middle Chinese final -p), which came to be written with ふ but pronounced u (as part of a diphthong).
The last table in the first row applies only to the terminal (終止形 shūshikei) and attributive (連体形 rentaikei) forms of the classical auxiliary verb ～む (-mu), which are pronounced ん (n).  While many other native Japanese words (for example, 汝 nanji archaic word for "you") with ん were once pronounced and/or written with む (mu), proper historical kana only uses む for ん in the case of the auxiliary verb, which is only used in classical Japanese.
The historical spellings in the second row of tables represent every theoretical representation of their modern counterpart.  It is possible, however, that some may not have occurred, or that they were so rare that they applied to only one or two words.  It is also possible that some spellings listed in the modern spellings column may not occur in any Japanese word, but they are theoretically possible and may occur in onomatopoeia or in katakana transcriptions of foreign languages.

Romanization 
Readers of English occasionally encounter words romanized according to historical kana usage. Here are some examples, with modern romanizations in parentheses:

Kwannon (Kannon): A Bodhisattva
Kwaidan (Kaidan), meaning ghost story, the title of a collection of Japanese ghost stories compiled by Lafcadio Hearn
Kwansei Gakuin University (Kansai): A university in Kobe and Nishinomiya
Iwo Jima (Iō-jima; now officially Iō-tō): An island known as the site of a battle during World War II

References

External links
 Old Japanese Kana Usage
 Historical kana usage: How to read
Imabi Lesson 378: Historical kana Orthography
 goo Jisho Online Japanese Kanji, compound, and phrase dictionary that gives historical kana spellings alongside modern spellings (although is only searchable by modern spellings)

Kana
Archaic Japanese language
Japanese orthography
Empire of Japan